Jerzy Snoppek (4 April 1904 – 1944) was a Polish boxer who competed in the 1928 Summer Olympics.

He was born in Katowice.

In 1928 he was eliminated in the second round of the middleweight class after losing his fight to Fred Mallin.

External links
 sports-reference.com

1904 births
1944 deaths
Middleweight boxers
Olympic boxers of Poland
Boxers at the 1928 Summer Olympics
Sportspeople from Katowice
People from the Province of Silesia
Polish male boxers
German military personnel killed in World War II
Missing in action of World War II
German Army personnel of World War II